Charkari may refer to:

Chakari, Afghanistan
Chakari, Iran (disambiguation)
Chakari, Zimbabwe